Łojewo may refer to the following places:
Łojewo, Kuyavian-Pomeranian Voivodeship (north-central Poland)
Łojewo, Pomeranian Voivodeship (north Poland)
Łojewo, Warmian-Masurian Voivodeship (north Poland)